Dawn of Paris is a 1936 Soviet drama film directed by Grigori Roshal.

Plot 
The film tells about the Polish revolutionary democrat, Jaroslav Dombrowski, who led the army of the Paris Commune in 1871.

Cast 
 Nikolai Plotnikov as General Dombrovsky
 Yelena Maksimova as Catherine Millard (as Ye. Maksimova)
 Andrei Abrikosov as Etienne Millard
 Viktor Stanitsyn as Battalion commander Shtaiper (as V. Stanitsin)
 Dmitri Dorlyak as Eugene Gorrot
 Anatoliy Goryunov as Richet the artist (as A. Goryunov)
 Vladimir Belokurov as Prosecutor Rigot
 Vera Maretskaya as Mother Pinchot

References

External links 
 

1936 films
1930s Russian-language films
Soviet drama films
1936 drama films
Soviet black-and-white films